Renanzinho may refer to:

 Renanzinho (footballer, born 1997), full name Renan Martins Pereira, Brazilian football defensive midfielder
 Renanzinho (footballer, born 2001), full name Renan Pereira Muniz Oliveira, Brazilian football forward